Peperomia yatuensis is a species of Amazonian plant from the genus Peperomia. It was described by Julian Alfred Steyermark in 1984, Venezuela.

References

yatuensis
Flora of South America
Flora of Venezuela
Plants described in 1984
Taxa named by Julian Alfred Steyermark